Pleasure Crazed is a 1929 American drama film directed by Donald Gallaher and Charles Klein and written by Douglas Z. Doty and Clare Kummer. The film stars Marguerite Churchill, Kenneth MacKenna, Dorothy Burgess, Campbell Gullan, Douglas Gilmore, and Henry Kolker. The film was released on July 7, 1929, by Fox Film Corporation.

Cast      
Marguerite Churchill as Nora Westby
Kenneth MacKenna as Capt. Anthony Dean
Dorothy Burgess as Alma Dean
Campbell Gullan as Gilbert Ferguson
Douglas Gilmore as Nigel Blain
Henry Kolker as Col. Farquar
Frederick H. Graham as Holland 
Rex Bell as Peters 
Charlotte Merriam as Maid

References

External links

 

1929 films
1920s English-language films
1929 drama films
Fox Film films
American black-and-white films
Films directed by Donald Gallaher
Films directed by Charles Klein
1920s American films